Swallow Tales is a 1971 album by British country rock band Cochise.

Cochise was most well known for guitarist Mick Grabham, who joined British rock band Procol Harum after Cochise dissolved in 1972.  The album was released in 1971, and featured several supporting artists including Tim Renwick and Cat Batchelor. The album was released by music label Liberty Records.

The album was originally released as an LP, and was later released on CD. The album was produced by Dick Taylor in conjunction with the band.

Background

The band were formed in 1969 and released their first album, Cochise, in 1970. The makeup of the band changed greatly before the recording of Swallow Tales as lead singer Stewart Brown was replaced by John Gilbert. Guitarist BJ Cole said that Gilbert's voice contrasted with the voice of Brown, as Gilbert sounded best on rock songs whereas Brown was more mellow. Critic Richie Unterberger (of Allmusic), however, felt that the music sounded largely the same as on their previous self-titled album, and described them as "middle of the pack" with neither "stylistic distinction" or "top-shelf songwriting".

The song-writing was done entirely by guitarists Mick Grabham and Cole, with the exception of "Love's Made a Fool of You" which is by Buddy Holly and Bob Montgomery.

Track listing

 "Love's Made a Fool of You" - (Buddy Holly, Bob Montgomery) - 2:51
 "Jed Collder" - (Mick Grabham) - 3:18
 "Down Country Girls" - (Mick Grabham) - 1:49
 "Home Again" - (Mick Grabham) - 3:41
 "Lost Hearts" - (BJ Cole) - 3:25
 "Strange Images" - (BJ Cole) - 2:03
 "Why I Sing the Blues" - (Mick Grabham) - 4:09
 "Another Day" - (Mick Grabham) - 5:16
 "Axiom of Maria" - (BJ Cole) - 7:02
 "Can I Break Your Heart" - (Mick Grabham) - 5:03
 "O Come All Ye Faithful" - (Traditional; arranged by BJ Cole) - 1:15

Personnel
Cochise
 John Gilbert - lead vocals
 BJ Cole - resonator and pedal steel guitars, design concept
 Mick Grabham - electric and acoustic guitars, backing vocals
 Rick Wills - bass, backing vocals, percussion
 Willie Wilson - drums, backing vocals, percussion
Additional musicians
 Caleb Quaye - piano (3, 5, 9), electric guitar (7)
 Nigel Olsson - harmony vocals (5)
 Steve Marriott - piano (6), backing vocals (6)
 Tim Renwick - electric guitar (7)
Additional personnel
 Roger Wake - engineer
 Hugh Fielder - liner notes
 Paul David Hickson - cover art, design conception
 W. Heath Robinson - front cover painting

References

Cochise (band) albums
1971 albums
Liberty Records albums